Biodegradable athletic footwear is athletic footwear that uses biodegradable materials with the ability to compost at the end-of-life phase. Such materials include natural biodegradable polymers, synthetic biodegradable polymers, and biodegradable blends. The use of biodegradable materials is a long-term solution to landfill pollution that can significantly help protect the natural environment by replacing the synthetic, non-biodegradable polymers found in athletic footwear.

Problem of non-degradable waste
The United States athletic shoe market is a $13 billion-per-year dollar industry that sells more than 350 million pairs of athletic shoes annually. The global footwear consumption has nearly doubled every twenty years, from 2.5 billion pairs in 1950 to more than 19 billion pairs of shoes in 2005. The increase in demand for athletic shoe products have progressively decreased the useful lives of shoes as a result of the rapid market changes and new consumer trends. A shorter life cycle of athletic footwear has begun to create non-degradable waste in landfills due to synthetic and other non-biodegradable materials used in production. The considerable growth in industrial production and consumption has made the athletic footwear industry face the environmental challenge of generated end-of-life waste.

Ethylene vinyl acetate copolymer
The athletic shoe midsole is one of the main contributors that lead to a generation of end-of-life waste because it is composed of polymeric foams based on ethylene-vinyl acetate (EVA). EVA is a polyolefin copolymer of ethylene and vinyl acetate that provides durability and flexibility, making it the most commonly used material found in athletic shoe midsoles. Although the synthetic polymer is a useful material for the athletic shoe industry, it has become an environmental concern because of its poor biodegradability. EVA goes through an anaerobic decomposition process called thermal degradation that often occurs in landfills resulting in releases of volatile organic compounds (VOCs) into the air. VOCs "contribute to the formation of tropospheric ozone, which is harmful to humans and plant life." Thermal degradation of EVA is temperature-dependent and occurs in two stages; in the first stage acetic acid is lost, followed by the degradation of the unsaturated polyethylene polymer.

Environmental impact
The environmental impacts of athletic shoe degradation in landfills "are inextricably connected to the nature of the materials." The production of many petroleum-based products, such as EVA, used to manufacture athletic shoes result in serious environmental pollution of groundwater and rivers when disposed into landfills. When disposed of in landfills, athletic footwear can take up to thousands of years to naturally degrade. EVA athletic shoe midsoles can be kept in contact with moist soil for a period of 12 years and experience little to no evidence of biodeterioration.

Although there are some that are taking initiatives to produce environmentally friendly athletic footwear, most of the footwear industry's response to this increasing problem of end-of-life shoe waste has been negligible. In order to reduce post-consumer waste and improve environmental properties of athletic shoes, biodegradable materials can help to replace synthetic polymers such as ethylene-vinyl acetate with the ability to compost at the end-of-life phase.

Biodegradable materials

"Biodegradation is a chemical degradation of materials provoked by the action of microorganisms such as bacteria, fungi, and algae." Although there are many materials categorized as biodegradable, there has been an increasing interest of biodegradable polymers that can lead to waste management options for polymers in the environment. These biodegradable polymers can be broken down into three categories: natural biodegradable polymer, synthetic biodegradable polymer, and biodegradable blends.

Natural biodegradable polymers
Natural biodegradable polymers are formed in nature during growth cycles of all organisms. When searching for natural fibers to replace synthetic materials in athletic shoes, the major natural biodegradable polymer that offers the most potential are polysaccharides. Starch is a polysaccharide that is useful because it readily degrades into harmless products when placed in contact with soil microorganisms.

Starch is not often used alone as a plastic material because of its brittle nature, but is commonly used as a biodegradation additive. Many plasticizers use starch-glycerol-water to modify starch's brittle nature. Biodegradation of this blend was tested and was found that by the second day the degraded carbon had already attained about 100% of the initial carbon of the sample.

Synthetic biodegradable polymer
Aliphatic polyesters are a diverse family of synthetic polymers of which are biocompatible, biodegradable, and non-toxic. Specifically, poly (lactic acid) has low melt strength and low viscosity properties that are similar to EVA midsoles in athletic shoes. Poly (lactic acid) (PLA) is part of the polyester group and can go through thermoplastic and foaming processes. Along with its good mechanical properties, its popularity is based on the non-toxic products that it becomes when it decomposes through hydrolytic degradation. Hydrolytic degradation of PLA generates the monomer lactic acid, which is metabolized via the tri-carboxylic acid cycle and eliminated as carbon dioxide.

Biodegradable blends
Most synthetic polymers are resistant to microbial attack because of their physical and chemical properties. However, they can become biodegradable when introducing natural polymers such as starch. Natural polymers introduce ester groups that attach to the backbone of non-biodegradable polymers, making them more susceptible to degradation. Due to biodegradable polymers having limited properties; blending synthetic polymers can bring economic advantages and superior properties.

End-of-life management
Although total elimination of post-consumer waste is not encouraged by any current change-causing agent due to the enormous change in infrastructure that the elimination of waste requires and the consequent lack of profitability for those agents, proactive approaches to reduce the enormous amount of waste that 350 million pairs of athletic shoes create can make a difference in the environment. Biodegradable materials, such as biodegradable polymers, are a viable solution to aid in avoiding the end-of-life athletic footwear waste consumption. The major advantage of introducing biodegradable polymers to athletic footwear is the ability to compost with other organic wastes for it to become useful soil attendant products.

An alternative short-term approach to end-of-life management is recycling activities in the footwear industry. One major shoe manufacture, Nike Inc., created Reuse-A-Shoe program that involves recycling discarded athletic shoes by grinding and shredding the shoes to produce a material called Nike Grind, which can be used in surfacing for tennis and basketball playgrounds or running tracks. Currently, the Reuse-A-Shoe program recycles approximately 125,000 pairs of shoes per year in the United States. 

Recycling and composting are two major proposed solutions to end-of-life management. However, the use of biodegradable materials is a long-term solution that can significantly help protect the natural environment by replacing synthetic, non-biodegradable polymers found in athletic footwear.

References

Athletic shoes
Biodegradable materials